New York's 79th State Assembly district is one of the 150 districts in the New York State Assembly. It has been represented by Democrat Chantel Jackson since 2021.

Geography
District 79 is in The Bronx. It comprises the neighborhoods of Morrisania, Melrose, Belmont, Claremont and East Tremont.

Recent election results

2022

2020

2018

2016

2014

2012

2010

References

79